The Japanese sandfish (Arctoscopus japonicus), also known as the sailfin sandfish , is a species of fish of the Percomorpha (perch-like) clade in the order Trachiniformes, being one of the two genera in the family Trichodontidae, the sandfishes. Its habitat occurs in sandy-mud bottoms ranging from the Sea of Japan to the Okhotsk Sea.

As a food source, the fish has mostly been sourced locally from the coastal region of the Sea of Japan, and has been designated the official prefectural fish of Akita Prefecture. The fish, which is scaleless, may be prepared whole as braised or grilled fish, and has a mucilaginous consistency. It is also dried to make stockfish; salted, dried, and made into himono; and cured in miso as misozuke. It is the main ingredient of the fish sauce called shottsuru. The egg masses are known as burikko. In Korean the fish is called  dorumuk.

The fish had also been used dried or in fish meal form as fertilizer, and shipped to agricultural areas at one time, into the 20th century.

Life cycle and behavior
The males reach sexual maturity at  years of age and beyond, and females at the 2-year-old stage; the individuals do not die after single spawning, and have several breeding cycles during their life span.

It preys and feeds on amphipods, copepods, mysidacea, krill, squid, and fish.

Distribution 
The Japanese sandfish is distributed in the northwestern Pacific Ocean, particularly the Sea of Japan to the Okhotsk Sea, Kurile Islands and Kamchatka Peninsula.

Three broad regional population groups had been postulated by Okiyama (1970) based on tagging, and later mitochondrial DNA analysis confirmed these grouping on a genetic basis. The population groups are:
 Western Japan (WJ) – This is a group that migrate the coast of the Sea of Japan from Tottori to Akita Prefecture. It comprises the "northern Sea of Japan" and "western Sea of Japan" subgroups. The spawning grounds of the group has been assumed to be off all along the coast, but bulk spawning grounds are absent around the Noto Peninsula and any further west/south, and in fact, it has been reported that the western Sea of Japan group's spawning grounds occur in the east coast of the Korean peninsula.
 South Hokkaido (SH) – This is a group with breeding grounds in the Pacific Ocean off Hokkaido.
 Eastern Korea (EK) – This group has breeding grounds in the eastern coast of the Korean Peninsula.

Catch production in the Tōhoku region (Northeastern Japan)'s Pacific coast (otherwise known as "Sanriku") is modest, and no regular spawning grounds have been confirmed. Migration routes have not been charted, but their travel range is considered extensive, since individuals from the Hokkaido and Sea of Japan population groups have been captured in the Sanriku shore.

External morphology 
The Japanese sandfish is silvery underneath, and light brown above with dark brown streaks flecked with spots. Tall body depth, though not as tall as the Pacific sandfish (Trichodon trichodon). Head and trunk are scaleless.

A large mouth, oblique and turned upwards, is lined with rows of fine teeth. The gill-flap on the cheek (preopercle) each has five sharp spines. It has a first dorsal and a second dorsal fin that are separated by a gap. The pectoral fins are particularly large. The fish lacks an air-bladder. It is active nocturnally, and during the day time lies buried in the mud or sand on the sea bottom, with only the mouth and eyes (and the spine) visible.

The egg mass (roe) is usually green, but may also have yellow, red, or brown coloration. Pigment components present in the eggs include bilin and carotenoids such as idoxanthin, crustaxanthin, and vitamin A2 aldehyde (3-dehydroretinal). The bilin and retinal produces the base green color, and the amount of relative idoxanthin content is the key determinant of the color variation. Study of its prey (such as the amphipods) or the fish's stomach contents reveal negligible traces of idoxanthin and crustaxanthin, which means the fish must be internally converting other carotenoid substances such as astaxanthin that are abundant in their food into idoxanthin and crustaxanthin, given that fish in general cannot build their own carotenoid wholly out of building block materials. Researchers hypothesize that the intake of astaxanthin influences the idoxanthin concentration in the body, which result in the egg color change.

Classification 

The Japanese sandfish was classified under the Perciformes (perch-likes) order, Trachinoidei suborder, and Trichodontidae (sandfishes) family. However, mitochondrial DNA analysis indicates that the Trichodontidae is classified within the suborder Cottoidei of the Scorpaeniformes order.

Similar species 
 Pacific sandfish, Trichodon trichodon, or ezo hatahata in Japanese, found from the Aleutian Islands to Alaska down to California.

Nomenclature 
The Japanese name hatahata may be written as 鰰, which consists of the fish radical 魚 combined with the character . Shokusanjin (Ōta Nanpo) records the lore that it came to be written this way "because within its scales arises the pattern of Mount Fuji, and was celebrated as auspicious fish," though the actual species has no scales.

In fact, hatahata is an old onomatopoeia representing the sound of the thunderclap, whose use is attested in the 10th century Kagerō Nikki, and which is the root of the verb hatata-ku "to thunder."

In Akita, the fish sometimes bears the name "satake uo" after the Satake clan who were rules of the land around 1600. But the Satakes were originally rooted in Hitachi Province (present-day Ibaraki Prefecture), and legend has it that the fish followed the masters from the old country (Shokusanjin notes that the legend is given in the ). In Tottori Prefecture the fish is called shirohata or kitaha.

Fishing practices 
The fish stock down further south are caught by Danish seine fishing.

In Akita Prefecture, each household used to buy them in bulk by the crates (5 or 10 crates at a time) when in season, and the surplus would be preserved as salted fish or as nukazuke to be consumed as a protein source over the winter.

FAO Statistics record that in 1950, the annual catch was  accounted solely in Japan, by the beginning of the 1970s Korean fisheries were catching half as much or more in tonnage as the Japanese. The global peak catch occurred in 1971 with  total, but by the end of the decade in 1979 there was a sharp collapse in the fish stock resulting in an annual catch of only .

Tottori prefecture is another area with significant participation in catching this species. Whereas Akita targets egg-carrying adults approach the surface to spawn, Tottori fishing practices capture the deep water migrating populations by bottom trawling, so that the caught fish tends to be fattier, though they do not carry eggs. The catch season for Tottori spans from September to May.

Fishing restrictions 
 Foraging, possessing and engaging in sales of egg masses are prohibited (Aomori and Akita)
 Fishing method restrictions (Aomori, Akita, Yamagata)

Uses 
At one time, dried hatahata was one type of fish-based fertilizer (fish manure) being trafficked in Japan.

Food ingredient 

The fish lacks scale, has few small bones, and the spine separates easily from the flesh, so that they are usually poached or broiled whole, or just with the head off. If the fish is fresh, snapping the bone at the base of the tail beforehand, will make it easier for the spine to come off easily after broiling.
Fresh hatahata can be served salted and broiled, or be poached in a pot flavored with soy sauce, sake kasu, and especially shottsuru. In Akita, the pot dish would be flavored with shottsuru, a fish sauce traditionally made by curing the fish in brine.

It can be made into hatahata-jiru (miso soup), but the miso should be dissolved in the broth before the fish is plunged, otherwise the fish falls apart.

In South Korea, the fish (known there as dorumuk) is eaten in communities in Gangwon Province and elsewhere along the Sea of Japan. In Korea it is mainly an ingredient for jjigae hot pot dishes, but sometimes the roe-laden females are grilled and eaten.

Shottsuru 

Locally, a fish sauce called shottsuru is made from this fish. The sauce which literally means "salty juice", is made by pickling and fermenting the salted fish, and straining out the debris. The fish sauce is used to flavor the shottsuru nabe, or pot dish that uses this flavoring to cook the hatahata with vegetable and other ingredients. In the Akita dialect, the pot dish also sometimes called shottsuru kayaki, with "" being the local term for nabe or hot pot dish.

Roe 
The fish is caught during its spawning season, when many of the females are loaded with eggs  in diameter. The eggs are surrounded by slimy mucous.

Fresh roe that is cooked will burst and make light popping sounds when eaten, but roe from the fish preserved in salt or miso turn rubbery and hard to chew, resulting in a more blunt sound that sounds like buri buri which resulted in its name.

The Japanese folk ballad known as Akita Ondo mentions the "Oga buriko" in the lyrics, which is a reference to the roe clusters.

See also 

 List of common fish names

Footnotes

Explanatory notes

Citations 

Trichodontidae
Fish of the Pacific Ocean
Fish of Korea
Japanese seafood
Korean seafood
Culture in Akita Prefecture
Fish described in 1881
Taxa named by Franz Steindachner